Fadel Aboud Al-Hassan or Haj Fadel Al-Aboud was a Syrian leader and head of the Haj Fadel government in eastern Syria after the Ottomans left the region in 1918.

Lineage
Fadel Al-Aboud was born in Deir al-Zour in 1872 for Al-Hassan family from the Abo Obaid clan from the Baggara tribe.

Personal life
Al-Hassan was of high social standing in Deir al-Zour, which enabled him to take over the leadership of his father, Aboud Hassan. Al-Hassan worked in trade and had extensive commercial relations with Turkish merchants and Halbians and with his cousins Najjar and Tayfur in the city of Hama.

Government Formation

Formation of the first government
Trouble broke out in the city of Deir al-Zour after the Ottomans left on 6 November 1918, where people began looting and stealing from each other across the area, so it was necessary to have a strong authority for protecting the city and its people and that led Al-Hassan who was the mayor to form his first government in the city and asking all tribal leaders in the villages and surrounding districts to support him and pledge allegiance to him. One of the priorities of this government was to maintain security and run the city's affairs. This government later known as the "government of Haj Fadel."

The government continued until the arrival of Sharif Nasser, the cousin of Prince Faisal Bin Al-Hussein, on 1 December 1918, and Mari Basha Al-Mallah on 7 December 1918.

Formation of the second government
After the Battle of Maysalun on 24 July 1920 and occupation of Damascus by French forces, The city of Deir Ezzor was in a state of chaos and insecurity, which prompted Al-Hassan to form his second government, Which has done excellent services in protecting the city and maintaining the security of its people despite its limited capabilities.

This government continued its work until 23 November 1920, when it was dissolved by a decision of the French occupation authorities.

Syrian National Congress

Al-Hassan represented the Euphrates region at the Syrian National Congress held in late June 1919, which proclaimed the independence of Syria and establishment of the Syrian Arab Kingdom on 8 March 1920, and appointed Faisal bin Sharif Hussein as a king. Al-Hassan participated in the coronation of Faisal as king of Iraq on 23 August 1921 and supported his inauguration.

Armenian genocide

When the Ottoman government persecuted the Armenian people and forced them to march out to the Syrian city of Deir al-Zour and the surrounding desert, without any facilities and supplies that would have been necessary to sustain the life of hundreds of thousands of Armenian deportees during and after their forced march to the Syrian desert.

Al-Hassan, who was the mayor of Deir al-Zour, provided them with food and housing. Means of livelihood and security, The Armenians returned the favor to Al-Hassan when the French colonial administration sentenced him to death in Aleppo, where they supported and defended him, which led the French to abolish the death penalty and only exile him to Jisr al-Shughur.

Struggle against the French mandate

Al-Hassan was arrested several times for his support of national issues and revolutions, after the storming of Deir al-Zour on 9 November 1921 by the French colonialists. A group of French armored vehicles and dozens of soldiers encircled the house of Al-Hassan, where he was arrested and transferred to the military airport of Deir al-Zour and then transported by military aircraft to Aleppo, where he was imprisoned in the castle. During his imprisonment, he met with the leader Ibrahim Hanano; in June 1922, he was released and returned to Deir Ezzor.

He was sentenced to exile to the city of Jisr al-Shughour after he was accused of preparing a revolt against French colonialism in protest against the military campaign by the French army against the Bukhabur tribes that refused to pay taxes to the French colonizer and insulting Wali Deir al-Zour Khalil Isaac. The latter was cooperating with the French.

He protested the decision of the French High Commissioner Maurice Paul Sarrail No. 49 S / 5 in August 1925, that ordered the exile of his cousin Ayyash Al-Haj with all his family members to the city of Jableh for their struggle against French colonialism, which exposed him to security persecution and repeated detention by the French military authorities.

Death
Al-Hassan died in 1936 in Deir al-Zour and was buried there. His sons continued his political work. His son, Dr. Badri Fadel Aboud, became the Minister of Health in the government of Said Al-Ghazi in 1955, under the presidency of President Shukri Al-Quwatli. He was the first Minister of Health from Deir al-Zour.

See also

 Ayyash Al-Haj
 Haj Fadel Government
 The epic of Ain Albu Gomaa
 Syria
 Deir ez-Zor
 Maurice Sarrail
 Timeline of Syrian history
 Syrian National Congress.
 King Faisal.
 Arab Kingdom of Syria.
 Great Syrian Revolt
 Al-Baggara.

References 

20th-century Syrian politicians
Syrian Sunni Muslims
Arabs from the Ottoman Empire
Syrian people of Turkish descent
Syrian Arab nationalists
Ottoman Arab nationalists
People from Deir ez-Zor
1872 births
1936 deaths